In mathematics, an elliptic Gauss sum is an analog of a Gauss sum depending on an elliptic curve with complex multiplication. The quadratic residue symbol in a Gauss sum is replaced by a higher residue symbol such as a cubic or quartic residue symbol, and the exponential function in a Gauss sum is replaced by an elliptic function.

Example

where
The sum is over residues mod  whose representatives are Gaussian integers
 is a positive integer
 is a positive integer dividing 
 is a rational prime congruent to 1 mod 4
 where  is the sine lemniscate function, an elliptic function.
 is the field 
 is the field 
 is a primitive th root of 1
 is a primary prime in the Gaussian integers  with norm 
 is a prime in the ring of integers of  lying above  with inertia degree 1

References

Algebraic number theory
Elliptic curves